One Mom and Three Dads is a 2008 South Korean television series starring Eugene, Jo Hyun-jae, Jae Hee, and Shin Sung-rok. It aired on KBS2 from April 2 to May 22, 2008 on Wednesdays and Thursdays at 21:55 for 16 episodes.

Synopsis
Song Na-young and her husband, Jung Sung-min desperately want a child, but Sung-min is unable to get her pregnant. Na-young suddenly loses her husband in an accident, and afterwards gives birth to a daughter. What she does not know is that three of her husband's friends donated sperm to Sung-min so that she could conceive successfully. The father of Na-young's child could either be Han Soo-hyun, Choi Kwang-hee, or Na Hwang Kyung-tae.

Cast

Main characters
 Eugene as Song Na-young
 Jo Hyun-jae as Han Soo-hyun
 Jae Hee as Choi Kwang-hee
 Shin Sung-rok as Na Hwang Kyung-tae
 Kim Bin-woo as Park Seo-yeon
 Joo Sang-wook as Jung Chan-young

Supporting characters
 Yoon Sang-hyun as Jung Sung-min
 Jang Young-nam as Noh Hee-sook
 Ko Do-young as Jang Joo-mi
 Jeon So-min as Nam Jong-hee
 Lee Hee-do as Song Mong-chan (Na-young's father)
 Park Chil-yong as Han Bong-soo (Soo-hyun's father)
 Jang Jung-hee as Lee Jin-nyeo (Kwang-hee's mother)
 Yang Hee-kyung as Hwang Soon-ja (Kyung-tae's mother)
 Kim Jin-tae as Park Dae-seok (Seo-yeon's father)
 Lee Chae-eun as Na-yeong's friend	
 Kim Ki-kyeon as President Jung (Chan-young's father)

References

External links
 One Mom and Three Dads official KBS website 
 
 

Korean Broadcasting System television dramas
Korean-language television shows
2008 South Korean television series debuts
2008 South Korean television series endings
South Korean romantic comedy television series
Television series by Kim Jong-hak Production
Television series by RaemongRaein